Sentenced for Life may refer to:
 Sentenced for Life (1911 film), an Australian film
 Sentenced for Life (1960 film), a low budget British crime film